Sri Lanka is an island nation in the Indian Ocean. The country is vulnerable to cyclones due to its position near the confluence of the Arabian Sea, the Bay of Bengal and the Indian Ocean.

List of storms

References

External links

Lists of tropical cyclones by area
Tropical cyclones